Bocchetta Pass or Bochetta Pass or Passo della Bocchetta is a mountain pass in the Ligurian Apennine Mountains in Liguria north of Genoa, Italy. The summit of the pass is at an elevation of 772 meters (2,532 feet).

Geography
It is crossed by a highway that connects Genoa and Alessandria. An old Roman road ran through Bocchetta Pass from Genua (modern Genoa) to Dertona (modern Tortona).

From the south, the SP5 (Provincial) highway follows the Polcevera valley north from the town of Campomorone. From the north, the SP160 highway approaches the pass along the Lemme valley via the towns of Gavi and Voltaggio. Currently, most traffic uses the Autostrada A7 which runs through the mountains  to the east.

Hiking 
The pass is also accessible by off-road mountain paths and is crossed by the Alta Via dei Monti Liguri, a long-distance trail from Ventimiglia (province of Imperia) to Bolano (province of La Spezia).

History
The Roman consul Spurius Postumius Albinus Magnus had the Via Postumia built in 148 BC. The Roman road connected Genoa with Tortona, Piacenza, and Cremona. At Calvatone (known as Bedriacum in Roman times) the road forked and the northern branch went to Verona while the southern branch went to Mantua. During the French Revolutionary Wars the Bocchetta Pass was located in territory belonging to the Republic of Genoa. Its north side was guarded by the fortress of Gavi.

See also
 List of mountain passes

Notes

References
Webster's New Geographical Dictionary, Third Edition. Springfield, Massachusetts: Merriam-Webster, Inc., 1997. .

Mountain passes of Liguria
Mountain passes of Piedmont
Mountain passes of the Apennines